Meridarchis luteus is a moth in the Carposinidae family. It was described by Walsingham in 1897. It is found in the Central African Republic.

References

Natural History Museum Lepidoptera generic names catalog

Carposinidae
Moths described in 1897